Takumi Yamazaki (born Isao Yamazaki , April 14, 1964 in Tokyo) is a Japanese voice actor best known for voicing Torippii the anthropomorphic green parrot in the Shimajiro TV series and in the Shimajiro film series.

Filmography

Television animation
1990s
Shima Shima Tora no Shimajirō (1993–present) - Torippii (Flappie)
Nintama Rantarō (1993) – Saburou Hachiya, Shuusaku Komatsuda
Brave Police J-Decker (1994) – Power Joe, Masaya Kashiwazaki
Magic Knight Rayearth (1994) – Ferio
Mobile Fighter G Gundam (1994) – George de Sand
Ping-Pong Club (1995) – Izawa
After War Gundam X (1996) – Roybea Loy
Detective Conan (1996) – Announcer
Flame of Recca (1997) – Hanemaru
Slayers TRY (1997) – Jillas Jillos Jilles
Devil Lady (1998) – Kiyoshi Maeda
Nightwalker: The Midnight Detective (1998) – Tatsuhiko Shido
Ojarumaru (1998) – Denbo Hachiro
Serial Experiments Lain (1998) – Lin Suixi

2000s
Final Fantasy: Unlimited (2001) – Joe Hayakawa
Hellsing (2001) – Incognito
Inuyasha (2001) – Juromaru and Kageromaru
Rune Soldier (2001) – Conrad
s-CRY-ed (2001) – Kunihiko Kimishima
.hack (2002) – Wiseman and Harald Hoerwick
Kinnikuman Nisei (2002) – Seiuchin
One Piece (2002) – Camus
Ashita no Nadja (2003) – Abel Geiger
Doraemon (2005) – Sunekichi Honekawa
Demonbane (2006) – Doctor West
Kenichi: The Mightiest Disciple (2006) – Haruo Nijima
.hack//Roots (2006) – Naobi/Yata
Gintama (2007) – Bansai Kawakami

2010s
Super Robot Wars (2010) – Archibald Grims
Fate/Zero (2011) – Kayneth El-Melloi Archibald
Hyōka (2012) – Omichi
Tamako Market (2013) – Dera Mochimazzui
One Piece (2015) – Kurozumi Kanjuro
Saint Seiya: Soul of Gold (2015) – Aries Mu
Demon Slayer: Kimetsu no Yaiba (2019) – Kasugaigarasu
The Case Files of Lord El-Melloi II: Rail Zeppelin Grace Note (2019) – Kayneth El-Melloi Archibald

2020s
Bofuri (2020) – Dred
Yashahime: Princess Half-Demon (2020) - Yotsume
Boruto: Naruto Next Generations (2023) - Bug

Original net animation (ONA)
JoJo's Bizarre Adventure: Stone Ocean (2022) – Ungalo

Original video animation (OVA)
Macross Plus (1994) – Isamu Alva Dyson
Initial D (2002) – Miki
Saint Seiya: Hades Chapter  (2002) – Aries Mu
Diebuster (2004) – Casio Takashiro
Mobile Suit Gundam: The Origin (2018) – M'Quve
Urotsukidoji (1993) - Ruddle

Theatrical animation
Doraemon: Nobita and the Kingdom of Clouds (1992) – Hoi's Father
Doraemon: Nobita and the Tin Labyrinth (1993) – Soldier A
Macross Plus: Movie Edition (1995) – Isamu Alva Dyson
Elmer's Adventure: My Father's Dragon (1997) – Roberta
Muscle Ginseng Competition! The Great Choujin War (2002) – Seiuchin
Gintama: The Movie (2010) – Bansai Kawakami
Shimajiro and Fufu's Big Adventure (2013) - Torippii, Flappie
Shimajiro and the Whale's Song (2014) - Torippii, Flappie
Shimajiro and the Mother Tree (2015) - Torippii, Flappie
Shimajiro in Bookland (2016) - Torippii, Flappie
Shimajiro and the Rainbow Oasis (2017) - Torippii, Flappie
Shimajiro the Movie: Adventures on Magic Island (2018) - Torippii, Flappie
Shimajiro and Ururu's Hero Island (2019) - Torippii, Flappie
City Hunter the Movie: Shinjuku Private Eyes (2019)
Shimajiro and the Fantastic Flying Ship (2021) - Torippii, Flappie
Shimajirō to Kirakira Ōkoku no Ōji-sama (2022) - Torippii, Flappie
Mobile Suit Gundam: Cucuruz Doan's Island (2022) - M'Quve

Tokusatsu
Shuriken Sentai Ninninger (2015) – Youkai Ittan-momen (ep. 9)
Kaitou Sentai Lupinranger VS Keisatsu Sentai Patranger (2018) – Pitchi kokku (ep. 11)

Video games

 Yata in .hack//G.U.
 Mu de aries in Saint seiya
 Ocelot in Metal Gear Solid 3: Snake Eater and Metal Gear Solid: Portable Ops
 Lemres and Akuma in Puyo Puyo Fever 2
 Archibald Grimms in Super Robot Wars Original Generations
 Emperor Peony IX in Tales of the Abyss
 Tilkis Barone in Tales of the Tempest
 Emilio Sanchez in Midnight Club: Street Racing
 Leinors in Tales of Destiny (PS2 Remake)
 Balan in Tales of Xillia
 Balan in Tales of Xillia 2
 Hayato Nekketsu in the Rival Schools series
 Haruo Niijima in Kenichi the Mightiest Disciple: Clash of the Eight Fists of Ragnarok! (Shijō Saikyō no Deshi Kenichi: Gekitō! Ragnarok Hachikengō!)
 Marin Reigan in Super Robot Wars Z and Z2
 Jotaro Kido/Blaster Kid in Super Robot Wars Alpha Gaiden/GC/NEO
 Doctor West in Super Robot Wars UX
 Nicole:Premier in Togainu no Chi
 Miki in Initial D Arcade Stage 8 ∞
 Aesir/Old Loptr in Bayonetta 2
 Bloody Geist in Bravely Second
 Zako in Fitness Boxing: Fist of the North Star

Drama CDs
 Abunai series 2: Abunai Summer Vacation (Papa Sudou)
 Abunai series 4: Abunai Campus Love (Sawada's friend)
 Abunai Series side story 1: Abunai Ura Summer Vacation (Papa Sudou)
 Blue na Koneko (Taku Arisugawa)
 Saigo no Natsuyasumi (Noda)

Dubbing roles

Live-action
Dr. Dolittle – Dr. Mark Weller (Oliver Platt)
Star Trek: Deep Space Nine – Rom (Max Grodénchik)
The X-Files – Bart "Zero" Liquori (Jack Black)
Mighty Morphin Power Rangers- Pudgy Pig- Food Fight (1993), A Pig Surprise (1994)

Animation
Batman: The Brave and the Bold – Psycho-Pirate
Cow and Chicken – Chicken
The Powerpuff Girls – The Talking Dog
Mickey and the Roadster Racers – Horace Horsecollar
South Park – Phillip

References

External links
 
 
 Takumi Yamazaki at GamePlaza-Haruka Voice Acting Database 
 Takumi Yamazaki at Hitoshi Doi's Seiyuu Database
  Official Shimajiro Website.
  Takumi Yamazaki imdb profile page.

1964 births
Living people
Japanese male video game actors
Japanese male voice actors
Male voice actors from Tokyo
20th-century Japanese male actors
21st-century Japanese male actors